José Antonio Cobián Ruíz (born 14 September 1998) is a Mexican professional footballer who plays as a midfielder.

References

External links
 LigaMX stats

1998 births
Living people
Association football midfielders
Atlante F.C. footballers
Club Necaxa footballers
Liga MX players
Ascenso MX players
Liga Premier de México players
Tercera División de México players
Footballers from Jalisco
Mexican footballers